Monocarboxylate transporter 6 (MCT6) is a protein in humans that is encoded by the SLC16A5 gene.

This gene encodes a member of the monocarboxylate transporter family and the major facilitator superfamily. The encoded protein is localized to the cell membrane and acts as a proton-linked transporter of bumetanide. Transport by the encoded protein is inhibited by four loop diuretics, nateglinide, thiazides, probenecid, and glibenclamide. Alternative splicing results in multiple transcript variants. [provided by RefSeq, Nov 2012].

References 

Genes on human chromosome 17
Solute carrier family